Leonela Felix (born October 4, 1987) is an American politician and lawyer who is the state representative in the Rhode Island House of Representatives for the 61st district. A member of the Democratic Party, she won election in the 2020 elections, primarying incumbent Democrat Raymond Johnston, and beating Republican Robert Wheeler in the general election. A progressive, Felix primaried Johnston with the support of the Working Families Party.

References

Hispanic and Latino American state legislators in Rhode Island
Hispanic and Latino American women in politics
Democratic Party members of the Rhode Island House of Representatives
Living people
1987 births